is a Japanese retired mixed martial artist, a designer, and an owner of MMA gym.

Mixed martial arts career
A former amateur wrestler, Asahi was trained in Satoru Sayama's Super Tiger Gym, where he learned shoot wrestling, and later moved to Noriaki Kiguchi's dojo to polish his skills. He made his debut in Shooto in 1992 submitting Tomoyuki Saito. Showing his grappling excellence, Noboru captured the Shooto Featherweight Championship from Kazuhiro Sakamoto and enjoyed a thirteen-fights winning streak, with victories over Yuki Nakai and Masato Suzuki, as well as Brazilian jiu-jitsu grappler Leandro Lima de Azevedo.

His streak snapped, however, when he was sent to the 1996 Vale Tudo Japan and fought another Brazilian jiu-jitsu specialist Royler Gracie. Asahi was taken down and held in side control, ending up with Gracie taking his back; he eventually escaped, but the game repeated itself and he got caught in a rear naked choke, being submitted. At the next Shooto event, Asahi lost to Alexandre Franca Nogueira by technical submission due to Nogueira's famed guillotine choke. Noboru did better in the next VTJ, fighting to a draw with yet another BJJ expert in the form of João Roque, but he fell again to Nogueira in a much longer fight, losing his title.

In 2001, Asahi retired from Shooto and founded the Tokyo Yellowmans gym.

Mixed martial arts record

|-
| Loss
| align=center| 19-6-5
| Tomomi Iwama
| TKO (punches)
| Deep - 10th Impact
| 
| align=center| 3
| align=center| 0:42
| Japan
| 
|-
| Loss
| align=center| 19-5-5
| Naoya Uematsu
| Decision (2-0)
| Shooto - R.E.A.D. 10
| 
| align=center| 3
| align=center| 5:00
| Japan
| 
|-
| Loss
| align=center| 19-4-5
| Alexandre Franca Nogueira
| Technical submission (guillotine choke)
| Shooto - Renaxis 4
| 
| align=center| 2
| align=center| 3:29
| Japan
| 
|-
| Draw
| align=center| 19-4-4
| Uchu Tatsumi
| Decision (1-1)
| Shooto - Renaxis 1
| 
| align=center| 3
| align=center| 5:00
| Japan
| 
|-
| Draw
| align=center| 19-4-3
| João Roque
| Draw
| Vale Tudo Japan 1998
| 
| align=center| 3
| align=center| 8:00
| Japan
| 
|-
| Win
| align=center| 18-4-3
| Trent Bekis
| Submission (keylock)
| Shooto - Las Grandes Viajes 5
| 
| align=center| 1
| align=center| 3:01
| Japan
| 
|-
| Loss
| align=center| 18-3-3
| Alexandre Franca Nogueira
| Technical submission (guillotine choke)
| Shooto - Shoot the Shooto XX
| 
| align=center| 1
| align=center| 1:06
| Japan
| 
|-
| Win
| align=center| 18-2-2
| Denis Hall
| Submission (armbar)
| Shooto - Las Grandes Viajes 1
| 
| align=center| 2
| align=center| 4:18
| Japan
| 
|-
| Loss
| align=center| 17-2-2
| Royler Gracie
| Submission (rear-naked choke)
| Vale Tudo Japan 1996
| 
| align=center| 1
| align=center| 5:07
| Japan
| 
|-
| Win
| align=center| 17-1-2
| Leandro Lima De Azevedo
| Technical submission (heel hook)
| Shooto - Vale Tudo Junction 2
| 
| align=center| 1
| align=center| 1:04
| Japan
| 
|-
| Win
| align=center| 16-1-2
| Iwan Njangka
| Submission (punches)
| Shooto - Vale Tudo Junction 1
| 
| align=center| 1
| align=center| 1:21
| Japan
| 
|-
| Win
| align=center| 15-1-2
| Anthony Lange
| Submission (armbar)
| Shooto - Vale Tudo Perception
| 
| align=center| 1
| align=center| 3:41
| Japan
| 
|-
| Win
| align=center| 14-1-2
| Leonid Zaslavsky
| Submission (heel hook)
| Shooto - Complete Vale Tudo Access
| 
| align=center| 3
| align=center| 0:48
| Japan
| 
|-
| Win
| align=center| 13-1-2
| Kyuhei Ueno
| Decision (unanimous)
| Shooto - Vale Tudo Access 2
| 
| align=center| 5
| align=center| 3:00
| Japan
| 
|-
| Win
| align=center| 12-1-2
| Nozomu Matsumoto
| Submission (keylock)
| Shooto - Vale Tudo Access 1
| 
| align=center| 1
| align=center| 0:13
| Japan
| 
|-
| Win
| align=center| 11-1-2
| Shinji Abe
| Submission (rear-naked choke)
| Shooto - Shooto
| 
| align=center| 1
| align=center| 0:41
| Japan
| 
|-
| Win
| align=center| 10-1-2
| Yuki Nakai
| Decision (2-0)
| Shooto - Shooto
| 
| align=center| 5
| align=center| 3:00
| Japan
| 
|-
| Win
| align=center| 9-1-2
| Masato Suzuki
| Submission (armbar)
| Shooto - Shooto
| 
| align=center| 5
| align=center| 1:39
| Japan
| 
|-
| Win
| align=center| 8-1-2
| Takashi Ishizaki
| Submission (armbar)
| Shooto - Shooto
| 
| align=center| 5
| align=center| 0:43
| Japan
| 
|-
| Win
| align=center| 7-1-2
| Hiroyuki Kanno
| Submission (armbar)
| Shooto - Shooto
| 
| align=center| 2
| align=center| 1:05
| Japan
| 
|-
| Draw
| align=center| 6-1-3
| Kenichi Tanaka
| Decision (0-0)
| Shooto - Shooto
| 
| align=center| 5
| align=center| 3:00
| Japan
| Asahi fought to a draw with Tanaka to remain the Shooto Featherweight Champion.
|-
| Win
| align=center| 6-1-2
| Kazuhiro Sakamoto
| Decision (2-0)
| Shooto - Shooto
| 
| align=center| 5
| align=center| 3:00
| Japan
| Asahi defeated Sakamoto to become the Shooto Featherweight Champion.
|-
| Draw
| align=center| 5-1-2
| Kenichi Tanaka
| Decision (0-0)
| Shooto - Shooto
| 
| align=center| 5
| align=center| 3:00
| Japan
| 
|-
| Win
| align=center| 5-1-1
| Masato Suzuki
| Submission (kneebar)
| Shooto - Shooto
| 
| align=center| 1
| align=center| ?
| Japan
| 
|-
| Draw
| align=center| 4-1-1
| Tomohiro Tanaka
| Decision (1-0)
| Shooto - Shooto
| 
| align=center| 4
| align=center| 3:00
| Japan
| 
|-
| Loss
| align=center| 4-1
| Kazuhiro Sakamoto
| Decision (unanimous)
| Shooto - Shooto
| 
| align=center| 5
| align=center| 3:00
| Japan
| 
|-
| Win
| align=center| 4-0
| Takashi Ishizaki
| Decision (unanimous)
| Shooto - Shooto
| 
| align=center| 4
| align=center| 3:00
| Japan
| 
|-
| Win
| align=center| 3-0
| Hiroyuk Sugano
| Submission (armbar)
| Shooto - Shooto
| 
| align=center| 1
| align=center| 0:38
| Japan
| 
|-
| Win
| align=center| 2-0
| Kazumi Chigira
| Decision (unanimous)
| Shooto - Shooto
| 
| align=center| 3
| align=center| 3:00
| Japan
| 
|-
| Win
| align=center| 1-0
| Tomoyuki Saito
| Submission (armbar)
| Shooto - Shooto
| 
| align=center| 1
| align=center| 2:54
| Japan
|

Mixed martial arts exhibition record

|-
| Draw
| align=center| 0-0-1
| Manabu Yamada
| Technical Draw
| Pancrase - Proof 3
| 
| align=center| 1
| align=center| 5:00
| Tokyo, Japan
| 
|-

Submission grappling record
KO PUNCHES
|- style="text-align:center; background:#f0f0f0;"
| style="border-style:none none solid solid; "|Result
| style="border-style:none none solid solid; "|Opponent
| style="border-style:none none solid solid; "|Method
| style="border-style:none none solid solid; "|Event
| style="border-style:none none solid solid; "|Date
| style="border-style:none none solid solid; "|Round
| style="border-style:none none solid solid; "|Time
| style="border-style:none none solid solid; "|Notes
|-
|Loss|| Hidehiko Matsumoto || Points || ZST GT-F || 2004|| || ||
|-

See also
Shooto
List of Shooto champions
List of male mixed martial artists

References

External links
Asahi Noboru Official Blog

1968 births
Living people
Japanese male mixed martial artists
Featherweight mixed martial artists
Lightweight mixed martial artists
Mixed martial artists utilizing catch wrestling
Mixed martial artists utilizing shoot wrestling
Japanese catch wrestlers
People from Yokosuka, Kanagawa
Sportspeople from Kanagawa Prefecture